A figure skating rink is an ice rink designed for figure skating. Alternatively it is used for other sports such as short track speed skating, ice hockey and bandy. It is usually rectangular.

Name origins 
Rink, a Scottish word meaning 'course', was used as the name of a place where another game, curling, was played. The name has been retained for the construction of ice areas for figure skating.

Basics

Dimensions 
The size of figure skating rinks can be quite variable. The International Skating Union (ISU) prefers Olympic-sized rinks for figure skating competitions, particularly for major events.

The scoring system rewards skaters who have good ice coverage, i.e. who efficiently cover the entire ice surface during their programs. Olympic-sized rinks make the differences in skill between skaters more apparent but they are not available for all events. If a rink has different dimensions, a skater's jump setup and speed may be hindered as he or she adjusts.

Ice quality 
Ice quality is judged by smoothness, friction, hardness, and brittleness. Factors affecting ice quality include temperature, water quality, and usage, with toe picks causing more deterioration. For figure skating, the ice surface temperature is usually kept between −5.5 °C (22 °F) and −3.5 °C (26 °F), slightly warmer than an ice hockey rink, which means softer ice and easier landings for the figure skaters.

Typically after every two warm-up groups during the competitions, an ice resurfacer cleans and smooths the surface of the ice sheet. Inadequate ice quality may affect skaters' performances.

Rinks for competitions

Requirements 

Officials shall not be seated on the ice surface. The Judges and the Referee will be seated at the rinkboard. If possible, the Technical Panel will be seated in an elevated position.

For the international competitions sanctioned by the ISU, at least one covered and preferably heated rink is required. For the ISU Figure Skating Championships, the Winter Olympic Games and the Winter Youth Olympic Games, two covered and closed rinks are required. For the ISU events, the Winter Olympic Games, the Winter Youth Olympic Games and the qualifying competition for the Winter Olympic Games, the ice rinks must be heated.

Kiss and cry 

The kiss and cry is the area in a figure skating rink where figure skaters wait for their marks to be announced after their performances during a figure skating competition. It is so named because the skaters and coaches often kiss to celebrate after a good performance, or cry after a poor one. The area is usually located in the corner or end of the rink and is furnished with a bench or chairs for the skaters and coaches and monitors to display the competition results. It is often elaborately decorated with flowers or some other backdrop for television shots and photos of the skaters as they react to their performance and scores.

For the Olympics 

Since short track speed skating was contested at the 1992 Winter Olympics, the rinks are used for figure skating and short track speed skating during those Winter Olympic Games.

See also 
 Ice rink
 Ice hockey rink
 Speed skating rink

References

External links 
 International Skating Union

Ice rinks
Rink
Sports venues by type